The Miami New Times is a newspaper published in Miami, Florida, United States, and distributed every Thursday. It primarily serves the Miami area and is headquartered in Miami's Wynwood Art District.

Overview
It was acquired by Village Voice Media, then known as New Times Media, in 1987, when it was a fortnightly newspaper called the Wave. The paper has won numerous awards, including a George Polk Award for coverage of the Major League steroid scandal in 2014 and first place in 2008 among weekly papers from the Investigative Reporters and Editors for stories about the Julia Tuttle Causeway sex offender colony. In 2010, the paper garnered international attention when it published a story by Brandon K. Thorp and Penn Bullock which revealed that anti-gay activist George Alan Rekers had hired a male prostitute to accompany him on a trip to Europe.

In September 2012, Village Voice Media executives Scott Tobias, Christine Brennan, and Jeff Mars bought Village Voice Media's papers and associated web properties from its founders and formed Voice Media Group.

Author Steve Almond is a former writer for the Miami New Times. Former Two Live Crew rapper Luther Campbell is a columnist for the paper.

References

External links
 

Mass media in Miami
Newspapers published in Florida
Alternative weekly newspapers published in the United States
1987 establishments in Florida
Newspapers established in 1987